Do3D was one of the first virtual reality computer software released for Microsoft Windows, being the first consumer product released by Superscape in 1998.

The purpose of the program was the ability to create your own virtual worlds, having the feature to implement them onto webpages with special plug-ins, and walk around them. It used low-polygon, simple 3D graphics, with the possibility of adding your own textures and colors into pre-made objects, or into construction blocks for custom buildings.

Its dedicated website, Do3D.com, is now offline. The "robots.txt" file present on the website's server prevented the pages from being archived by the Wayback Machine.

External links
 News on Do3D's launch

Windows multimedia software
1998 software
Virtual reality